Stonewall Kitchen is a specialty food producer based in York, Maine, United States. The company was founded as a homemade products stall at a local farmers market in 1991 and today sells in 42 countries. They make items such as jam, chutney, jellies, grill sauce, cooking oil and mustard.

On March 14, 2022, the company was acquired by TA Associates.

History 
Founders Jonathan King and Jim Stott started their business as a homemade products stall at the local farmers market. Working from a small folding table and calling themselves Stonewall Kitchen, the stall was successful, selling all stock.
 
Stonewall Kitchen expanded their product line to include vinegars, oils, pesto, jams and baked goods. After selling at multiple venues, the operation branched out into selling wholesale.

In 1993, Crate & Barrel approached them for 2,500 jars of their Orange Cranberry Marmalade. The order was filled but it took a month to do it. To increase production capacity, they purchased and renovated an eighteenth-century barn in Kittery, Maine. Then moved again to a larger property in nearby York, Maine.
 
The owners attended the Fancy Food Show in New York City. Gaining the Outstanding Preserve award for their Roasted Garlic Onion Jam. They also earned a second award, for Outstanding Product Line. Afterward, they received over 500 orders from retailers across the country.

By 1999, Stonewall Kitchen moved production to another larger facility. A visitors area was added to this facility in 2003. Another expansion took place in 2006 when a Cooking School was added to the York facility. In April 2021, Stonewall Kitchen acquired Vermont Coffee Company.

Between 2019 and 2022, the company was owned by Audax Private Equity. On March 14, 2022, TA Associates acquired Stonewall Kitchen.

Products 
Stonewall Kitchen is known for jams. Their product line also includes grille sauces, mustards, chutneys, pancake mixes and dessert sauces, as well as kitchen tools, place settings and home decor items.

In 2006, Stonewall Kitchen launched the Barefoot Contessa Pantry line in conjunction with chef Ina Garten, best known as the host of Barefoot Contessa on Food Network. This partnership ended in 2011.

In May 2018, Stonewall Kitchen agreed to a licensing agreement with Legal Sea Foods to launch line of specialty seafood sauces and marinades throughout the United States.

References

External links 
 Official Website

Food and drink companies of the United States
Companies based in York County, Maine
York, Maine
2019 mergers and acquisitions
2022 mergers and acquisitions